Imperia (stylized in all caps) is a Bosnian record label, which was founded by Sarajevo rappers, Jasmin Fazlić and Amar Hodžić.

History 
The company was founded in the beginning of 2019 in Sarajevo, Bosnia and Herzegovina by Sarajevo rappers, singers and music producers, Jasmin Fazlić and Amar Hodžić. The idea of Imperia was made real in 2006 in the form of a YouTube channel, which over time evolved to a record label and media company. In 2019, the company was centralized under one parent company, under which operate several subsidiares, such as Imperia TV, Imperia Clothing and Euromedia Broadcasting Limited. The company also operates in TV production, audio distribution and visual content, and publishes content on YouTube, Facebook and Instagram.

Genres 
Imperia distributes world genres, such as pop, hip-hop, trap, and turbofolk.

Artists 

 Jala Brat
 Buba Corelli
 Maya Berović
 Milan Stanković
 Inas

References

External links 
 Službena stranica

Record labels
Music in Sarajevo